Christer Corpi (born 28 March 1960) is a Swedish boxer. He competed at the 1980 Summer Olympics and the 1984 Summer Olympics.

References

1960 births
Living people
Swedish male boxers
Olympic boxers of Sweden
Boxers at the 1980 Summer Olympics
Boxers at the 1984 Summer Olympics
Sportspeople from Stockholm
Light-heavyweight boxers
20th-century Swedish people